The Chungmu class was a class of 3 destroyers in the Republic of Korea Navy. They entered service in 1963, with the last one being decommissioned in 1989.

History 
South Korea received three destroyers of the Fletcher class for the Republic of Korea Navy from the USA in 1963 as part of the American Military Assistance Program.

This was the first destroyer class of the Republic of Korea Navy. While the Gwanggaeto the Great-class destroyer were Korea's first domestically built destroyers, ships of the Chungmu class, were the first destroyers to serve in the Republic of Korea Navy.

The class consisted of three destroyers used by the US Navy during World War II and slightly modernized in electronics and weaponry at the beginning of the 1950s. They were once magnificent ships, which throughout the 1960s constituted the backbone of the Republic of Korea Navy. Eventually, they were replaced in escort duties by the Chungbuk class destroyers in the mid to late 1980s. However, they remained in service until well into the 1980s, by which point they were quite obsolete. They were all leased until 1977 then bought by the navy.

They were all put out of service between 1982 and 1993.

Characteristics 

Before the takeover, the ships were modernized considerably. All 20 mm Oerlikon cannons were removed while the two quad and one twin 40 mm Bofors guns remained. The electronics were modernized and the mast was replaced by a tripod mast.

All ships were retrofitted with two triple Mark 44 torpedo tubes on each side of the ship.

Ships in the class

Citations 

Destroyer classes
Fletcher-class destroyers of the Republic of Korea Navy
Ships transferred from the United States Navy to the Republic of Korea Navy